Valentin Bozhkov (born May 2, 1958 in Samokov) is a Bulgarian ski jumper that competed in the 1984 Winter Olympics in Sarajevo. He took 37th place in the Normal hill (70 metres hill).

Sources

External links 

Bulgarian male ski jumpers
Olympic ski jumpers of Bulgaria
Ski jumpers at the 1984 Winter Olympics
Living people
1958 births
People from Samokov
Sportspeople from Sofia Province